Echinothrips is a genus of thrips in the family Thripidae. There are about seven described species in Echinothrips.

Species
These seven species belong to the genus Echinothrips:
 Echinothrips americanus Morgan, 1913
 Echinothrips asperatus Hood
 Echinothrips cancer O'Neill
 Echinothrips capricorn O'Neill
 Echinothrips caribeanus Hood, 1955
 Echinothrips floridensis (Watson, 1919)
 Echinothrips subflavus Hood, 1927

References

Further reading

 
 
 
 
 
 

Thripidae
Articles created by Qbugbot